Temper is a dance music group that was led by Anthony Malloy.

Chart history
Their only chart entry was with the song "No Favors", which hit number one on the Billboard Hot Dance Music/Club Play chart in 1984. The song peaked on the U.S. R&B chart at number 64.

Malloy also formed the group Anthony and the Camp.

Band members
Anthony Malloy 
Cleveland Wright III

Discography

Singles
1984:  "No Favors" (MCA-23506)  
1985:  "Fever" (MCA-23524)

See also
List of number-one dance hits (United States)
List of artists who reached number one on the US Dance chart

References

Musical groups established in 1984
Musical groups disestablished in 1985
American dance music groups
American boogie musicians
American electro musicians
American musical duos